Pierre Alonzo may refer to:

 Pierre Alonzo, pseudonym of Richard E. Hughes (1909–1974), American writer and editor of comic books
 Pierre Alonzo (footballer) (born 1940), former French football midfielder